The Pizza Triangle ( and also released as Drama of Jealousy) is a 1970 Italian commedia all'italiana film directed by Ettore Scola and written by Scola and the famous screenwriter duo of Age & Scarpelli. It stars Marcello Mastroianni, Monica Vitti, Giancarlo Giannini. It was coproduced with Spain and Spanish actors Manuel Zarzo and Juan Diego are dubbed into Italian. The film is available on DVD in Germany, released by WB as Eifersucht auf italienisch, and in Italy.

Plot
Adelaide (Monica Vitti) is a florist who begins to date Oreste (Marcello Mastroianni), who is an already married construction worker. However, Nello (Giancarlo Giannini), a pizza cook, interposes in the relationship, seducing Adelaide as well. The situation ensues in a quarrel, after which she is injured and hospitalized. Then, the three of them decide to live together but, eventually, the confused Adelaide leaves them after attempting suicide, to get involved romantically with Ambleto (Hércules Cortés), a butcher. Nonetheless, Nello the cook attempts suicide and the moved Adelaide returns with him. Oreste, who is unemployed now, intervenes again. Adelaide refuses both so another fight ensues, which causes the death of Adelaide.

Cast
 Marcello Mastroianni – Oreste Nardi
 Monica Vitti – Adelaide Ciafrocchi
 Giancarlo Giannini – Nello Serafini
 Manuel Zarzo – Ughetto
 Marisa Merlini – Silvana Ciafrocchi
 Hercules Cortez – Ambleto Di Meo
 Fernando Sánchez Polack – District Head of Communist Party
 Gioia Desideri – Adelaide's Friend
 Juan Diego – Antonia's Son
 Bruno Scipioni – Pizza maker
 Josefina Serratosa – Antonia
 Giuseppe Maffioli – Lawyer
 Paola Natale – Flower Seller
 Brizio Montinaro – Restaurant Night Guard

Awards
Marcello Mastroianni won the Best Actor award at the 1970 Cannes Film Festival.

References

External links

1970 films
1970s Italian-language films
Films directed by Ettore Scola
1970 comedy films
Commedia all'italiana
Titanus films
Films set in Rome
Films shot in Rome
Films with screenplays by Age & Scarpelli
Films scored by Armando Trovajoli
Films with screenplays by Ettore Scola
1970s Italian films